Guyhirn Chapel of Ease, also known as Guyhirn Old Church, is a small rectangular chapel in Guyhirn, Cambridgeshire noted for being built during the Puritan Commonwealth of England. It has survived relatively unchanged since this time, and is a Grade II* listed building under the care of the Churches Conservation Trust.

History
Money to build the chapel was left in 1651, and the building was thus designed for Puritan worship during the Cromwellian Commonwealth of England. It was built on a site which may have been the location of a medieval chantry (there is evidence of some older stone in the structure). By the 17th century, the land was owned by Thomas Parke of Wisbech, who had Puritan sympathies. After his death in 1630, his land was purchased by Peterhouse, Cambridge, and it is on part of this land that the chapel was built. A stone above the door records the date 1660, by which time the Restoration had returned Anglicanism as the official religious observance. The chapel was never consecrated, as the consecration and licensing of churches was suspended during the Commonwealth.

At the Restoration, it became a chapel of ease under the vicar of St Peter and St Paul, Wisbech until 1854 when Wisbech St Mary was created a separate parish. The Bishop of Ely consecrated the grounds of the Chapel as a burial ground in 1840. In 1871, a new parish of Guyhirn with Rings End was created, and the chapel became a church in its own right until George Gilbert Scott's new church of St Mary Magdalene was opened in 1878. From then, it became a mortuary chapel (under which name it is recorded by Nikolaus Pevsner in his 1954 survey of the Buildings of England). Despite restoration work in 1918, its condition deteriorated during the 20th century, and the last service was held in 1960.

The Vicar of Guyhirn during the 1970s Donald Dickinson began an initiative to restore the chapel, and by 1973 the 'Friends of the Guyhirn Chapel of Ease' was formed under the presidency of Sir John Betjeman. The chapel was restored and rededicated by the Bishop of Ely in July 1975. Betjeman wrote a short poem entitled "Guyhirn Chapel of Ease" for a pamphlet in 1977, later anthologised in Harvest Bells: New and Uncollected Poems in 2019. After Betjeman's death, the writer Edward Storey became the president of the Friends. Supported by the Friends, the chapel is in the care of the Churches Conservation Trust and is recorded in the National Heritage List for England as a designated Grade II* listed building.

Description
The building has remained largely unchanged throughout its existence, and its design retains an austere Puritan aesthetic; constructed of brick and Barnack stone, with five windows of clear leaded glass set in stone mullions. The roof is of red pantiles topped by a small wooden bellcote containing a 17th century bell dated 1637.

The interior consists of close-set oak pews, which prevented the congregation kneeling for prayer, a practice disapproved of by Puritans. There is little decoration, with a low plastered ceiling, brick paving, clear glass and plain walls, meaning the congregation's focus is on the spoken word of the minister in the raised pulpit. Rows of hat pegs on the walls allow for large 17th century headwear to be hung. Two Regency-era ventilators in the ceiling are the only later decorative elements.

References

Guyhirn
Grade II* listed churches in Cambridgeshire
Church of England church buildings in Cambridgeshire
Churches preserved by the Churches Conservation Trust
17th-century Church of England church buildings
Churches completed in 1660